Paul Carl Meger (February 17, 1929 – August 27, 2019) was a Canadian professional ice hockey forward. Meger played his entire National Hockey League (NHL) career with the Montreal Canadiens, winning the Stanley Cup in 1953. His career lasted from 1950 until 1955.

References

External links

1929 births
2019 deaths
Canadian ice hockey forwards
Montreal Canadiens players
Ice hockey people from Saskatchewan
Stanley Cup champions